Western Heights High School, Oklahoma City is the high school of Western Heights Public Schools, which is a small independent school district located in southwest Oklahoma City, Oklahoma, United States of America. It is located at 8201 SW 44th St, Oklahoma City, OK 73179.

Alumni
 Jared Hess, wrestler, retired professional MMA fighter

External links 
 Western Heights High School
 Western Heights Public Schools

Public high schools in Oklahoma
Schools in Oklahoma City